Jazz Eyes is an album by saxophonist John Jenkins and trumpeter Donald Byrd recorded in 1957 and released on Regent Records (a subsidiary of Savoy Records). Savoy issued it again later with the alternate title Star Eyes.

Reception

Brandon Burke of Allmusic reviewed the album observing: "In keeping with much of Regent and Savoy's output at the time, all four tunes are based upon very relaxed, mid-tempo bop heads. As compositions, they aren't entirely memorable, but that shouldn't take anything away from the sublime groove maintained throughout the LP. Recommended".

Track listing 
All compositions by John Jenkins except where noted
 "Star Eyes" (Gene de Paul, Don Raye) - 10:00  
 "Orpheus" - 8:20  
 "Honeylike" - 9:15  
 "Rockaway" - 10:00

Personnel 
John Jenkins - alto saxophone
Donald Byrd - trumpet
Curtis Fuller - trombone
Tommy Flanagan - piano
Doug Watkins - bass
Art Taylor - drums

Production
Ozzie Cadena - producer
Rudy Van Gelder - engineer

References 

John Jenkins (jazz musician) albums
Donald Byrd albums
1957 albums
Savoy Records albums
Albums produced by Ozzie Cadena
Albums recorded at Van Gelder Studio